The Piano Sonata No. 5, Op. 53, is a work written by Alexander Scriabin in 1907. This was his first sonata to be written in one movement, a format he retained from then on. A typical performance lasts from 11 to 12 minutes. The work is considered to be one of Scriabin's most difficult compositions, both technically and musically.

Composition

After finishing his symphonic poem Le Poème de l'Extase, Op.54, Scriabin did not feel comfortable living in Paris. In early September 1907 he wrote: Life is fearfully expensive, and the climate is rotten. The air in the areas where we could find an apartment big enough for us at a reasonable price is frightful ... you cannot make any noise. You have to wear house slippers after 10 at night.

Scriabin decided to go to live in Lausanne with his pregnant wife Tatyana, since he found the place to be cheaper, quieter, and healthier, and only 7 hours away from Paris. Also, he had his music being printed there, as he had recently broken his long-term partnership with publisher M.P. Belaieff due to financial discrepancies.

In his new peaceful household in Edifice C Place de la Harpe, Scriabin could play the piano without fear of complaints from neighbours, and soon began to compose again, alongside the revisions he was making to the score of Le Poème. On 8 December, Tatyana wrote to a friend:
We go out a little, having caught up on our sleep. We begin to look normal again. Sasha even has begun to compose – 5th Sonata!!! I cannot believe my ears. It is incredible! That sonata pours from him like a fountain. Everything you have heard up to now is as nothing. You cannot even tell it is a sonata. Nothing compares to it. He has played it through several times, and all he has to do is to write it down ...

In late December, Scriabin wrote to Morozova about the imminent completion of his new work:
The Poem of Ecstasy took much of my strength and taxed my patience. ... Today I have almost finished my 5th Sonata. It is a big poem for piano and I deem it the best composition I have ever written. I do not know by what miracle I accomplished it ...

Although the actual writing took only six days, from 8 to 14 December 1907, some ideas had been conceived much earlier. The initial nine bars of the first theme of the exposition, Presto con allegrezza (mm. 47 ff.), can be found in a notebook from 1905 to 1906, when Scriabin was in Chicago. Another notebook from 1906 contains the Imperioso theme (mm. 96 ff.), while elements from the Meno vivo (mm. 120 ff.) can also be made out, as well as sketched-out passages for a few other sections.

Scriabin included an epigraph to this piano sonata, extracted from his essay Le Poème de l'Extase:
Original Russian text
Я к жизни призываю вас, скрытые стремленья!
Вы, утонувшие в темных глубинах
Духа творящего, вы, боязливые
Жизни зародыши, вам дерзновенье приношу!
Original French translation
Je vous appelle à la vie, ô forces mysterieuses!
Noyées dans les obscures profondeurs
De l'esprit créateur, craintives
Ebauches de vie, à vous j'apporte l'audace!
English translation
I call you to life, O mysterious forces!Drowned in the obscure depths
Of the creative spirit, timid''
Shadows of life, to you I bring audacity!

Five months after its completion, Scriabin published the work himself in Lausanne, producing an edition with 300 copies. He later gave the autograph as a present to his pupil Alfred La Liberté. In 1971 the pianist's widow gave the manuscript, along with various other documents, to the Scriabin Museum.

The work was premiered on 18 November 1908 in Moscow by pianist Mark Meitschik.

Structure
The piece is written in sonata form with an introduction. The structure of the work is described in the table below:

Harmonic language

According to Samson, unlike his later sonatas, the sonata-form of this work still has some meaning to the work's tonal structure. That means the sonata is arguably in F-sharp major (owing to the initial key signature of six sharps), but the sonata could also be said to be atonal due to its lack of a definite tonal center.

The work does not contain any perfect cadence, nor any consonant chord.

The work features one of the strange occurrences of the complete mystic chord spelled in fourths (mm. 264 and 268). Jim Samson points out that it fits in well with Scriabin's predominantly dominant quality sonorities and harmony as it may take on a dominant quality on C or F. This tritone relationship between possible resolutions is important to Scriabin's harmonic language, and it is a property shared by the French sixth (also prominent in his work).

The piece also contains an incipient instance of the mystic chord which helps illuminate its origins in tonal language; first appearing at m. 122, the set [0 2 4 6 T] is presented as a dominant chord with the flat fifth degree in the bass, later revealed to be an extended appogiatura to the tonic (m. 134), over which the same notes form a major 13th chord in root position. Compare this presentation with the 'mature' mystic chord, [0 1 3 5 7 9].

Recordings
This is Scriabin's most recorded sonata. Pianist Sviatoslav Richter described it as the most difficult piece in the entire piano repertory.

Notable recordings include those by Alexei Sultanov, Vladimir Ashkenazy, Vladimir Horowitz, Sviatoslav Richter, Vladimir Sofronitsky, Michael Ponti, Samuil Feinberg, Glenn Gould, Garrick Ohlsson, Marc-André Hamelin, Bernd Glemser, Maria Lettberg, Igor Zhukov and Pietro Scarpini.

Notes

References

External links

Piano Sonata 05
1907 compositions